The Lazio regional election of 2005 took place on 3–4 April 2005.

Piero Marrazzo (Independent of The Union) defeated incumbent Francesco Storace (AN, House of Freedoms).

The defeat in Lazio for House of Freedoms was especially important as the centre-right expected to maintain control of the Region. Storace, a leading member in the centre-right, was subsequently granted the status of Minister of Public Health in Berlusconi III Cabinet.

During the electoral campaign, Storace came out with factual evidence that Alessandra Mussolini's Social Alternative had added fake signatures to real ones to reach the minimum number needed to present a list. However, to demonstrate this, he had someone "hack" into the database of the municipality of Rome in order to verify the signatures: he was therefore nicknamed "Storhacker" by Mussolini. It also appeared that someone spied on the centre-left candidate Marrazzo. Storace however denied all the charges.

Results

References

Elections in Lazio
2005 elections in Italy